Conquest of the Desert was a Specialised Expo recognised by the 28th General Assembly of the Bureau International des Expositions on 13 November 1951, held in Jerusalem in 1953 at Binyanei Ha'uma, a convention center in Jerusalem. It focused on the themes of reclamation and population of desert areas.

History
The exhibition was opened on 22 September by President Ben Zvi and acting Prime Minister Moshe Sharett. It lasted for 22 days, closing on 14 October. It was visited by 600,000 people.

Thirteen foreign countries participated which included the United States although it declared a boycott of the opening ceremony. The Soviet Union declined to attend. Both UNESCO and the World Health Organization also attended.

Postage stamps commemorating the exhibition were designed by Abram Games.

See also
Culture of Israel

References

1950s in Jerusalem
1953 in Israel
20th century in technology
Culture of Jerusalem
Desert greening
Entertainment events in Israel
Exhibitions
Land reclamation
Technology events
World's fairs in Israel
1953 festivals